Rescobie Loch is a post glacial fresh water body located in the parish of Rescobie,  to the East of Forfar, in the county of Angus, Scotland. The loch is fed by Lunan Water which enters from the West and exits to the East.

History
Rescobie's name may have originated from the Scottish Gaelic “Ros Sgolban” meaning "the wood of splinters or thorns“. Historically it has also been referred to as Rosolpin, Roscolpin, Roscolbyn, Roscoby and Rescobis.
Historically Rescobie's importance far exceeded its present-day status.

Rescobie Loch is believed to be the location of Rescobie Castle also referred to as Barnsdale Castle.
 There is no trace of the castle today.

In 1097 King Donald III of Scotland was dethroned and held captive in Rescobie Castle where his brother Edgar blinded him in both eyes. He died in 1099 and was buried initially at Dunkeld Cathedral before being finally laid to rest at the Scottish Island of Iona and was the last of the early Scottish Kings to be buried there.

Biodiversity
Rescobie Loch together with its neighbour, Balgavies Loch, have been classified as a Biological Site of Special Scientific Interest (SSSI code 1345) and as such are protected and monitored. It is a diverse habitat for both wildlife and plants.

Fishing
In the early 1960s the Rescobie Loch Development Association was formed to manage and run the fishing. Only fly fishing is allowed from either bank or boat and the loch is regularly stocked with Rainbow Trout and Brown Trout.

Gallery

References

Map of Rescobie Loch Bathymetrical Survey of the Freshwater Lochs of Scotland 1897–1909 (National Library of Scotland)

Lochs of Angus, Scotland
Freshwater lochs of Scotland